The 2017 Super2 Series (known for commercial reasons as the 2017 Dunlop Super2 Series) was an Australian motor racing competition for Supercars, staged as a support series to the Virgin Australia Supercars Championship. It was the eighteenth annual Supercars Development Series.

The series was won by Todd Hazelwood, driving a Holden VF Commodore for Matt Stone Racing.

A few substantial changes were seen for the 2017 season including the new rules of the Super2 program. This saw the opportunity for Dunlop Series teams to field a Wildcard entry in up to two of the four Virgin Australia Supercars Championship events at Winton, Barbagallo Raceway, Hidden Valley and Queensland Raceway. This program was developed to encourage more cars and teams to get involved in the Supercars Championship. The Bathurst round of the Super2 Series became a non-pointscoring round for the first time since 2004, to encourage more cars and teams to submit wildcard entries for the Bathurst 1000.

Teams and drivers
The following teams and drivers competed in the series.

Calendar
The 2017 calendar was released on 27 September 2016.

Points system
Points were awarded in each race as follows.

Series standings

See also
 2017 Supercars Championship

References

External links
 

Supercars Development Series
Dunlop Series